A Sphere in the Heart of Silence is a collaborative studio album by John Frusciante and Josh Klinghoffer, released on November 23, 2004 on Record Collection. The fifth in a series of six releases Frusciante issued, from June 2004 to February 2005, the album is composed mainly of electronica-based material.

Frusciante notes, "It's electronic music, but much more raw. We recorded this the same way we did Inside of Emptiness - with all the out-of-control qualities that I've been building toward with my style of playing and recording - but we used electronic instruments. There are some techno things with punk-rock-type screaming vocals. It's only a seven-song album, but it's, like thirty-eight minutes long."

The vinyl edition of the record saw a repressing from Record Collection on December 11, 2012.  These reissued records are 180 gram and come with a download of choice between MP3 and WAV formats of the album.

Track listing

Personnel
Musicians
John Frusciante – programming, white noise, guitar, lead vocals (on "The Afterglow", "Walls", and "My Life"), backing vocals, vocal treatments, synthetic strings, drum treatments, acoustic guitar, synthesizer, bass, piano, producer, design
Josh Klinghoffer – arp string ensemble, guitar, bass, synthesizers, drum loops, drums, lead vocals (on "Communique", "At Your Enemies", and "Surrogate People"), backing vocals, one note synth, piano, producer

Production
Ryan Hewitt – engineer, mixing
Chris Reynolds – assistant
Jason Gossman – assistant
Bernie Grundman – mastering
Lola Montes Schnabel – photography
Mike Piscitelli – design
Dave Lee – equipment technician

References

John Frusciante albums
2004 albums